Derbyshire County Cricket Club in 1893 was the cricket season when the English club Derbyshire had been playing for twenty two years. Derbyshire's matches were not considered to be first class in this season. The club had lost first class status after 1887 and did not regain it until the following year 1894. However many of the players competed for the club earlier or subsequently at first-class level.

1893 season

Derbyshire played sixteen games and apart from two against Cheshire and one against MCC, these were all against future clubs in the County Championship or the touring Australians. They won seven matches and lost six, which was a sufficient prelude to their return to first-class status in the following 1894 season. Sydney Evershed was in his third season as captain. Harry Bagshaw was top scorer. George Davidson topped the bowling.

William Taylor noted that during Derbyshire's period in exile many fine players wore their colours including S H Evershed, who in captained the eleven with marked ability for many years and the grand veteran, Levi Wright -  "a magnificent batsman and unsurpassed as a fieldsman in the oldfashioned position of square-point".

Frank Mycroft made his debut in the season, standing in as wicket-keeper for William Storer who also played for MCC and other teams. Mycroft went on to play three more seasons for Derbyshire. Joseph Ward and Joseph Soult only played in this season for Derbyshire and never achieved first-class status. Soult played just one match while Ward bowled in a useful manner in four matches.

Matches

Statistics

Batting averages

Bowling averages

Wicket Keeper

William Storer Catches 32, Stumping 5

See also
Derbyshire County Cricket Club seasons
1893 English cricket season

References

1893 in English cricket
Derbyshire County Cricket Club seasons
English cricket seasons in the 19th century